The 2019 South Kesteven District Council election took place on 2 May 2019 to elect members of South Kesteven District Council. This was on the same day as other local elections. The entire council (56 seats) was up for election. The incumbent Conservatives lost 5 seats and UKIP lost 1, while independents gained 5 and the Liberal Democrats gained 2. Two wards (Aveland and Dole Wood) did not hold a vote, as an equal number of candidates ran as seats available.

Results

|}

Results by ward

Aveland

No election was held, as just 1 candidate ran for the seat.

Belmont

Belvoir

Bourne Austerby

Bourne East

Bourne West

Casewick

Castle

Deeping St James

Philip Dilks had been elected in 2015 as Labour, and Judy Stevens as an independent.

Dole Wood

No election was held, as just 1 candidate ran for the seat.

Glen

Grantham Arnoldfield

Grantham Barrrowby Gate

Grantham Earlesfield

Grantham Harrowby

Grantham Springfield

Grantham St Vincent's

Grantham St Wulfram's

Isaac Newton

Lincrest

Loveden Heath

Market and West Deeping

Morton

Peascliffe and Ridgeway

Stamford All Saints

Stamford St George's

Stamford St John's

Stamford St Mary's

Toller

Viking

By-elections between 2019 and 2023

Glen by-election

Grantham Arnoldfield by-election

Stamford All Saints by-election

Aveland by-election

Isaac Newton by-election

Bourne East by-election

Grantham St Wulfram's by-election

Toller by-election

References

South Kesteven
May 2019 events in the United Kingdom
South Kesteven District Council elections